Paratropes mexicana is a species of cockroach within the family Ectobiidae that is distributed in Mexico. States within the Mexico the species is found in include Hidalgo, Veracruz, Tlaxcala, and Chiapas.

References 

Insects described in 1865
Cockroaches
Insects of Mexico